The 1918 Akron football team represented the University of Akron, formerly Buchtel College, in the 1918 college football season. The team was led by head coach Fred Sefton, in his fourth season. Akron outscored their opponents by a total of 69–47.

The season was shortened to just five games due to the outbreak of the worldwide influenza epidemic.

Schedule

References

Akron
Akron Zips football seasons
Akron football